Ombrana is a monotypic genus of frogs in the family Dicroglossidae. It is represented by a single species, Ombrana sikimensis. The validity of this genus is currently considered uncertain.

Ombrana sikimensis is found in central and eastern Nepal and in parts of northeastern India (Sikkim, West Bengal, and Meghalaya). It may also occur in Bhutan.

References

External links
 ITIS page

Dicroglossidae
Frogs of India
Amphibians of Nepal
Amphibians described in 1870